Rolls Gracie (1951–1982) was a Brazilian martial artist. He was a prominent member of the Gracie family known for their founding of Brazilian jiu-jitsu and considered by some the family's best ever fighter. He was teacher of Rickson Gracie, Carlos Gracie Jr., Royler Gracie, Maurício "Maurição" Motta Gomes, Márcio "Macarrão" Stambowsky, Rigan Machado and Romero "Jacare" Cavalcanti. He died in a hang-gliding accident in 1982. He is the father of Rolles Gracie and Igor Gracie.

The Famous Five
The Famous Five was a nickname for the original five black belt students of Rolls Gracie, who were well-known for their fighting skills. Just prior to his untimely death, Rolls promoted a sixth black belt into the group. The established terminology persisted so that the following six men continued to be called "The Famous Five."

 Márcio Stambowsky
 Mauricio Gomes
 Romero Cavalcanti
 Nicin Azulay
 Paulo Conde
 Mario Claudio Tallarico

References

1951 births
1982 deaths
Accidental deaths in Brazil
Brazilian people of Scottish descent
Rolls
IBJJF Hall of Fame inductees
People awarded a red belt in Brazilian jiu-jitsu
20th-century Brazilian people